Sony is a Japanese multinational conglomerate corporation.

Sony may also refer to:
Sony, Mali, a commune
Sony Corporation of America
Sony Music
Sony Pictures
Sony Pictures Entertainment Japan
Sony Records, now-defunct record label founded by Ike Turner

People with Sony as given name or surname
Jean Sony (born 1986), Haitian footballer
Sony Michel (born 1995), an American football running back
Warrick Sony (born 1958), South African composer

See also
 
 SNY (disambiguation)
 Sonny (disambiguation)